The Alcestiad is an opera in three acts by Louise Talma to a libretto that Thornton Wilder wrote based on his 1955 play of the same name. It was the first full-length opera by an American woman staged at a major European opera house.

History 
The American composer Louise Talma collaborated with Thornton Wilder, who created the libretto based on his 1955 play The Alcestiad: Or, a Life in the Sun (1955) which was in turn based on Alcestis by Euripides. It was Wilder's idea to set the plot to music and approach Talma. She delivered sketches already in 1955, which Wilder approved. Talma composed the work in three acts and used serial composition techniques.

Wilder managed to interest Harry Buckwitz of the Städtische Bühnen Frankfurt in the world premiere. Wilder, who was awarded the Friedenspreis des Deutschen Buchhandels (peace prize of the German book trade) in 1957, was well received in Germany. The opera premiered on 1 March 1962 at the Oper Frankfurt, in a German version  by Herberth Herlischka. It was directed by Harry Buckwitz, and conducted by Wolfgang Rennert. It was the first full-length opera by an American woman staged at a major European opera house. The first performance was not critically acclaimed, but nevertheless covered by the international press, including The New York Times and the Salzburger Nachrichten. Critics from the FAZ and the Los Angeles Times wrote that, while the music was skillfully crafted, the libretto was "too strong" for music. The music was described as influenced by Schoenberg, Honegger and Stravinsky, with "harsh brass dissonances and shattering percussion effects".

The opera remained Talma's only composition for the stage.

Roles

References

External links 
 Bruce Duffie: Composer Louise Talma / A Conversation with Bruce Duffie (pictured) bruceduffie.com 1986

Operas
1962 operas
German-language operas
Operas based on plays
Operas based on works by Euripides
Works based on Alcestis (play)